Irakli Azarovi (born 21 February 2002) is a Georgian footballer who plays as a left-back for Serbian side Red Star Belgrade and the Georgia national team.

Club career

Dinamo Tbilisi
Born in the Georgian capital, Tbilisi, Azarovi joined the historically most succesdull club in the country, and, a magnet to local talents, FC Dinamo Tbilisi, at age of 10. He trained regularelly in the youth teams of the club all the way until 2019 when he debuted for the Dinamo first team. Playing mostly as a reserve, he made 7 appearances in 2019, and 5 in 2020 season, comtributing in both for Dinamo to win the Georgian national title.

Dinamo Batumi
In 2021, FC Dinamo Batumi was betting strong and bringing quality reinforcements, so Azarovi made a move that earned him much more play time and becoming a regular in the starting line-up, resulting in a successful season crowned with a 2021 Georgian championship. This also made him became a regular call in the Georgian national team, resulting in a widespread interest from clubs from abroad.

Red Star Belgrade
Soon, after a half season with Dinamo Batumi in the 2022 season, Serbian club Red Star Belgrade brought Azarovi to their ranks. In December 2022, he was announced as a top 10 most talented left-backs in world football.

International career
Azarovi made his international debut for Georgia on 2 June 2021, starting in a friendly match against Romania.

Before that, he was a regular in all youth team squads since 2017.

Career statistics

International

Honours
Dinamo Tbilisi
 Erovnuli Liga: 2019, 2020

Dinamo Batumi
 Erovnuli Liga: 2021

References

External links
 

2002 births
Living people
Footballers from Tbilisi
Footballers from Georgia (country)
Georgia (country) youth international footballers
Georgia (country) under-21 international footballers
Georgia (country) international footballers
Association football fullbacks
FC Dinamo Tbilisi players
FC Dinamo Batumi players
Erovnuli Liga players